Lien Te-an (born October 29, 1994 in Taiwan) is a Taiwanese luger who has competed since 2012. He competed in the first ever Youth Olympics in Innsbruck, Austria, where he finished 20th out of 25th. Te-An also competed for Chinese Taipei at the 2014 Winter Olympics in Sochi, Russia, where he placed 39th in the men's single competition.

Career

2018 Winter Olympics
Te-an qualified to compete for Chinese Taipei at the 2018 Winter Olympics, marking the second straight Olympics he will compete in luge for the country.

References

External links
 

1994 births
Olympic lugers of Taiwan
Living people
Lugers at the 2014 Winter Olympics
Lugers at the 2018 Winter Olympics
Taiwanese male lugers
Lugers at the 2012 Winter Youth Olympics